1. FC Bad Kötzting is a German association football club from the city of Bad Kötzting, Bavaria.

History
Founded on 5 May 1921 as 1. FC Kötzting, the club spent most of its existence as a lower-tier side until earning promotion to the Landesliga Bayern-Mitte (V) in 1990. The club had a good second season in this league, finishing third in 1993, but it came close to relegation in 1998, when it could only come 15th.

The team came close to advancing to the Bayernliga (IV) in 2000, finishing as league vice-champions before losing on penalties to SpVgg Landshut in the promotion round. They earned promotion in 2004. The club adopted its new name in 2006 after the city changed its name in 2005. 1. FC Bad Kötzting was relegated in 2010 and the team, after this, played in the Landesliga Bayern-Mitte again. At the end of the 2011–12 season the club qualified for the promotion round to the newly expanded Bayernliga. A first round loss to FC Amberg however meant the club would remain in the Landesliga instead. The club won the Landesliga Mitte in 2014 and earned promotion back to the Bayernliga. The club won promotion to the Bayernliga in 2014, after a Landesliga championship, but came only fifteenth in the league in 2014–15 and was forced to enter the promotion/relegation round where it suffered relegation after being defeated by ASV Burglengenfeld.

Bad Kötzting plays its home matches in the Stadion am Roten Steg which has a capacity of 6,000 (800 seats).

Honors

League
 Landesliga Bayern-Mitte (V)
 Champions: 2004
 Runners-up: 2000
 Landesliga Bayern-Mitte (VI)
 Champions: 2014
 Bezirksoberliga Niederbayern (V)
 Champions: 1990

Cup
 Niederbayern Cup
 Winners: 2005

Recent seasons
The recent season-by-season performance of the club:

With the introduction of the Bezirksoberligas in 1988 as the new fifth tier, below the Landesligas, all leagues below dropped one tier. With the introduction of the Regionalligas in 1994 and the 3. Liga in 2008 as the new third tier, below the 2. Bundesliga, all leagues below dropped one tier. With the establishment of the Regionalliga Bayern as the new fourth tier in Bavaria in 2012 the Bayernliga was split into a northern and a southern division, the number of Landesligas expanded from three to five and the Bezirksoberligas abolished. All leagues from the Bezirksligas onwards were elevated one tier.

References

External links
 Official team site
 1. FC Bad Kötzting profile at Weltfussball.de
Das deutsche Fußball-Archiv historical German domestic league tables (in German)

Football clubs in Germany
Football clubs in Bavaria
Association football clubs established in 1921
Football in Middle Franconia
1921 establishments in Germany
Cham (district)